Carlo Bernardini (22 April 1930 – 21 June 2018) was an Italian physicist and politician who served as a Senator from 1976 to 1979.

References

1930 births
2018 deaths
20th-century Italian physicists
Senators of Legislature VII of Italy
Politicians of Apulia
People from Lecce
21st-century Italian physicists